Finders Keepers is a British children's game show based on the original American format of the same name. It was originally broadcast on ITV between 12 April 1991 and 6 August 1996, hosted by Neil Buchanan. It was then revived from 6 January to 14 April 2006, hosted by Jeff Brazier.

Format
Two teams of two called the green meanies and the yellow terrors are given the opportunity to "raid the room" across eight rooms and two rounds to find hidden objects, found by clues read out by the host prior to raiding. Each room raid lasted 30 seconds and if the object was found, won the team 25 points in the first round, and 50 points in the second.  If a team did not find their object, the points went to the other team. Each raid was hectic because the rooms had streamers, confetti, and Silly String raining from the ceiling as the raids went on.

In the early series of the original run, the teams had to firstly win rooms to raid at the garage door, they go off and raid them as above.  The process was repeated for the second round.  In later series both teams had two rooms to raid from the off; the later four rooms were won at the garage door.  The final series of the original run in 1996 saw format changes; the teams now had to find items in the garage to get a head start in room searching.  They were now searching for the same item on both floors of the house.

The 2006 revival returned to the format of the original without the "find objects in a garage" round and changed the final round time limit back to three minutes.

In all versions the team with the most points win the right to go the "Super Search", which is a race to find eight hidden objects in three (later four) minutes. The more objects found, the better the final prize. The final series of the original run had a prize awarded for successful searching in each room and a grand prize in the final room, closer to the original American format.

The teams were color-coded green and yellow; in the US version, they were red and blue.

Rooms
Mum and Dad's Bedroom
Bathroom
Landing
Kids Bedroom
Fantasy Room/Attic (Series 6 only)/Mystery Room
Store Room/Utility Room (Series 6 only)/Garden Room
Kitchen
Hallway
Living Room
Study
Laundry room

Jeremy's Joker
In the 3rd, 4th and 5th seasons of the Buchanan era, some rooms (usually the Fantasy Room) had Jeremy's Joker on them. If the team found the object, they would win a holiday. This was named after Jeremy Stockwell, the in voice announcer and writer of for the early Finders Keepers series. In the first 2 seasons, one of the rooms was the surprise prize room, usually signalled with a fanfare playing as the room was entered. Both Jeremy's Joker and the Surprise Prize were identical to the Instant Prize room on the American version, but unlike the American version, this room could show up in any round and the opposing team would win the prize if the team searching the prize room failed to find the object.

Celebrity Guests
In several episodes of series 3, 4 and 5, there were celebrity guests, usually to be found in the Fantasy Room. In the Sleeping Beauty-themed room, Frank Bruno was sleeping behind a curtain and the contestants had to find a clue without waking Frank. In the last episode of series 3, Neighbours twins Gayle and Gillian Blakeney appeared from a giant teapot in the Mad Hatter's tea party-themed room.

More celebrity guests would appear in series 4 to aid the contestants. The first episode of series 4 featured Olympic swimmer Adrian Moorhouse in an Underwater-themed room, Gladiator Panther guest appeared in a Jungle-themed room, and Grange Hill's Anna Quayle appeared in a School-themed room.

Even more celebrity guests appeared in series 5 to help the contestants including Michael Aherne (a.k.a. Warrior) from Gladiators.

The celebrity guests would also make cameo appearances in the Super Search, performing mundane tasks throughout the house as a visual gag while the contestants passed through the rooms.

In the final original series (1996), Buchanan was joined by Gladiators star Diane Youdale as co-host.

Transmissions

External links
 
 
 Finders Keepers (1991-1996) at BFI
 Finders Keepers (2006) at BFI
 

1991 British television series debuts
2006 British television series endings
1990s British children's television series
2000s British children's television series
British children's game shows
1990s British game shows
2000s British game shows
British television series based on American television series
English-language television shows
ITV children's television shows
Television shows produced by Scottish Television
Television shows produced by Television South (TVS)
British television series revived after cancellation